Seán Óg Ó Ceallacháin (12 May 1923 – 17 February 2013) was a journalist, broadcaster and sportsman. He played Gaelic football and hurling for the Eoghan Ruadh club and also played for the Dublin county hurling team.

Biography
Ó Ceallacháin was born in Newcastlewest, County Limerick, and grew up in Fairview, County Dublin, where he attended a Gaelscoil. He twice won the Feis Ceoil competition for his singing talents in the Irish language. He married Anna McDonagh in 1954. They had three children. Finín, Caitríona, and Sinéad.  He lived most of his married life in Raheny, Dublin.

He represented Dublin from 1943 to 1953 in hurling and played in the 1948 All-Ireland Senior Hurling Championship Final, scoring a goal, and also played in the 1945–46 National Hurling League Final.

Ó Ceallacháin had a Sunday night radio programme on Raidió Teilifís Éireann (RTÉ) entitled Gaelic Sports Results, which was the longest running continuously broadcast radio feature in the world. He took over the show in place of his father in 1953 and retired after the broadcast of 8 May 2011, fifty-eight years later. The Gaelic Sports Results programme had a worldwide audience amongst the Irish diaspora through satellite and web broadcasting. He began his media career with The Evening Press and continued until its closure in 1995. Ó Ceallacháin died on Sunday 17 February 2013 aged 89.

Honours
Leinster Senior Hurling Championship (3): 1944, 1948, 1952

Books
His Own Story, Brophy Books, 1988.
The Birth Of A Building,
History of Hermitage Golf Club: Celebrating 100 Years (1905 to (2005),
Tall Tales and Banter, Eason & Son
My Greatest Sporting Memory, Calmac Publishing, 2000.
The Dubs, Gill & Macmillan, 2006.
Giants of Gaelic Football, Gill & Macmillan Ltd (Oct 2007)

Plays
A Scent of Hawthorn
A Man from the Island

Radio plays
An Braon Searbh
Aedin agus an Cailleach

Video
History of Hermitage Golf Course

References

External links
 Seán Óg's radio show
 Speech by Bertie Ahern at the Launch of The Dubs
 Launch of book on Hermitage Golf Course

1923 births
2013 deaths
Dual players
Dublin inter-county hurlers
Dublin Gaelic footballers
Gaelic games players from County Limerick
Gaelic games writers and broadcasters
Irish male dramatists and playwrights
Irish radio writers
Irish sports broadcasters
Mass media people from County Limerick
People from Newcastle West
RTÉ Radio 1 presenters
The Irish Press people
20th-century Irish dramatists and playwrights
20th-century male writers
21st-century Irish writers
21st-century Irish male writers
Writers from County Limerick